Ramesh Randeer "Manoj" David (born 8 February 1975) is a Sri Lankan-born cricketer who has played three One Day Internationals and four Twenty20 Internationals for Canada.

References

External links 

1975 births
Living people
Canada One Day International cricketers
Canada Twenty20 International cricketers
Canadian cricketers
Canadian people of Sri Lankan Tamil descent
Canadian sportspeople of Sri Lankan descent
Sri Lankan cricketers
Sri Lankan emigrants to Canada
Cricketers from Colombo